Charles Gérin-Lajoie (1824–1895) was a Quebec businessman and political figure. He represented Saint-Maurice in the House of Commons of Canada as a Liberal member from 1874 to 1878.

Biography 
He was born André-Charles Gérin-Lajoie at Yamachiche, Lower Canada on 28 December 1824, to André Gérin and Ursule Caron, daughter of Charles Caron.

He studied at the Séminaire de Nicolet. He owned mills and a factory at Yamachiche. In 1863, Gérin-Lajoie was elected to the Legislative Assembly of the Province of Canada for Saint-Maurice as a member of the Parti rouge. He opposed Confederation, but was elected to the federal parliament in 1874 running as a Liberal. In 1878, he was named superintendent of Public Works for Saint-Maurice and he served in that function until his death at Trois-Rivières on 6 November 1895.

References

External links 

Charles Gerin-Lajoie
Caron family
1824 births
1895 deaths
Liberal Party of Canada MPs
Members of the House of Commons of Canada from Quebec
Members of the Legislative Assembly of the Province of Canada from Canada East
People from Mauricie